Archbishop Marin Srakić (born 6 July 1937) is a Croatian Roman Catholic prelate who served as an auxiliary bishop of Đakovo or Bosna and Srijem and Titular Bishop of Cercina (1990–1996), and after that, as a Coadjutor Bishop (1996–1997), a Diocesan Bishop (1997–2008) and the first Archbishop of Đakovo-Osijek since 2008 until his retirement in 2013.

Education
Archbishop Srakić was born into a Croatian Roman Catholic family of Marko and Katja (née Orešković) in a present-day Osijek-Baranja County.

After graduation the Archdiocesan Classical Gymnasium in Šalata in Zagreb, he made the maturity exam at the lyceum of the Theological College in Đakovo and consequently joined the Theological Faculty at the University of Zagreb, where completed his studies with a Licentiate of the Theology degree, and was ordained as priest on March 6, 1960 for his native Roman Catholic Diocese of Đakovo or Bosna and Srijem. Fr. Srakić continued his studies at the Pontifical Lateran University in Rome, Italy with a Doctor of the Moral theology degree.

Pastoral and educational life
After completed his education, Fr. Srakić made the following services: from 1960 to 1961 he was a spiritual assistant in Slavonski Brod; from 1961 to 1965 was a parish administrator in Podgajci Podravski; from 1965 to 1967 and from 1970 to 1973 an educator at the Theological Seminary in Đakovo; from 1977 to 1989 rector of the Major Theological Seminary in Đakovo; from 1966 to 1967 and from 1970 to 1999 Professor of Moral Theology at the Theological College in Đakovo, later Theology in Đakovo, a field study of the Catholic Theological Faculty of the University of Zagreb.

Prelate
On February 2, 1990, he was appointed by Pope John Paul II as an Auxiliary Bishop of Đakovo or Bosna and Srijem and Titular Bishop of Cercina. On March 24, 1990, he was consecrated as bishop by Cardinal Franjo Kuharić and other prelates of the Roman Catholic Church in the Cathedral of St. Peter and St. Paul in Đakovo. He was appointed as a Vicar General of this Diocese (1990–1997) and consequently was appointed as a Coadjutor Bishop of this Diocese on February 10, 1996, and succeeded as the Diocesan Bishop on February 6, 1997. At the session of the Episcopal Conference of Croatia in Gospić on October 18, 2007, he was elected president of the Conference and held that position for a quinquennium until November 2012.

Retired on April 18, 2013, after reached age limit of 75 years old.

References

1937 births
Living people
People from Osijek-Baranja County
University of Zagreb alumni
Pontifical Lateran University alumni
20th-century Roman Catholic bishops in Croatia
21st-century Roman Catholic archbishops in Croatia
Bishops appointed by Pope John Paul II